Beauvoir is a commune in the Manche department in the Normandy region in northwestern France. Andrés de Santa Cruz Died there in 1865.

Population

See also
Communes of the Manche department

References

Communes of Manche